Miah (মিঞা / মিয়া), is a Bengali word used to refer to a gentleman and is also used as a surname. People with the surname include:

 Abu Taher Miah (c.1932–2004), Bangladeshi industrialist and politician 
 Andrew Muzaffar Miah, Anglo-Bangla bioethicist and journalist
 Badrul Miah, convicted of the racially motivated murder of Richard Everitt
 Badsha Miah, Bangladeshi kabaddi player
 Bonde Ali Miah (1906–1979), Bangladeshi poet
 Dhir Ali Miah (1920–1984), Bangladeshi flute player, composer, director and orchestra conductor
 Ellis Miah, American songwriter, record producer, composer, vocalist and DJ of Bangla-Caribbean descent
 Fazal Karim Miah, Indian politician
 Hammad Miah (born 1993), English professional snooker player
 Kaptan Miah (1872-1922), politician, lawyer and entrepreneur
 Kola Miah (1895-1948), first Agriculture Minister of Pakistan
 M. A. Wazed Miah (1942–2009), Bangladeshi nuclear scientist
 Mohammad Mamun Miah (born 1987), Bangladeshi footballer
 Mohammad Moniruzzaman Miah (c.1935–2016), Bangladeshi academic
 Moina Meah, Bangladeshi restaurateur and social reformer
 Muhammad Shahjahan Miah, Bangladeshi politician
 Nurul Haque Miah (1944-2021), Bangladeshi professor of chemistry
 Rana Miah, Bangladeshi cricketer
 Saiman Miah (born 1986), British-Bangladeshi architectural designer and graphic designer
 Sheikh Sujat Mia, former MP for Habiganj-1
 Tamanna Miah, British Bangladeshi activist
 Tofazzal Hossain Manik Miah (1911–1969), Bengali journalist and politician
 Tommy Miah, Bangladeshi British chef
 Wakil Miah, Bengali politician and lawyer

See also
 Mia (disambiguation)
 Mian (disambiguation)

Titles in Bangladesh
Bengali Muslim surnames